Alec Cameron may refer to:
 Alec Cameron (academic) (born 1963), vice chancellor and chief executive of Aston University
 Alec Cameron (rugby union) (1866–1957), Scotland international rugby union player
 Alec Cameron (soccer), Australian soccer player

See also
 Alex Cameron (disambiguation)